The women's shot put event at the 2015 Asian Athletics Championships was held on June 7.

Results

References

Shot
Shot put at the Asian Athletics Championships
2015 in women's athletics